Andreja Klepač and Sílvia Soler Espinosa were the defending champions, but Soler Espinosa chose not to participate this year. Klepač played alongside Lara Arruabarrena, but lost in the first round to Chuang Chia-jung and Liang Chen. 

Julia Görges and Lucie Hradecká won the title, beating Chuang and Liang in the final, 6-3, 6-1.

Seeds

Draw

Draw

References
Main Draw

Connecticut Open - Doubles
Doubles